Thomas Alex Ian Taylor (born 21 December 1994) is an English first-class cricketer, active since 2014, who plays for Northamptonshire. Born in Stoke-on-Trent, he is a right-handed batsman who bowls right arm medium-fast pace. He previously played for Derbyshire, making his debut on 8 June 2014 in the 2014 County Championship against Leicestershire. He made his Twenty20 debut on 29 August 2020, for Leicestershire in the 2020 t20 Blast.

References

1994 births
Living people
Derbyshire cricketers
Leicestershire cricketers
Northamptonshire cricketers
English cricketers
Cricketers from Stoke-on-Trent